Olegario Pachón Núñez (Bienvenida, 1907–Llerena, 1996) was an Extremaduran anarchist.

Biography 
He was born in the Badajoz town of Bienvenida in 1907. Born into a peasant family, in his youth he worked in the fields as a day laborer . During the years of the Second Spanish Republic he joined the anarchist movement, forming part of the National Confederation of Labor (CNT).

After the outbreak of the Spanish Civil War he joined the confederal militias, fighting on the Extremadura front. He came to command the Pío Sopena battalion, which was deployed on the fronts of Talarrubias and Casas de Don Pedro. Later, he joined the structure of the People's Army of the Republic. During some months of 1937 he was at the head of the 113th Mixed Brigade, which manned the quiet front of the Tagus-Extremadura. He also commanded 91st Mixed Brigade, taking part in the Battle of Merida pocket. Towards the end of the war he was commander of the 37th Division.

Towards the end of the war he fled to Alicante, but upon reaching the port he discovered that there were no boats for the refugees. He was taken prisoner by Franco's forces and imprisoned in the concentration camps of Albatera and Porta Coeli. However, he managed to escape and flee to France. There he managed to establish himself and collaborated with the anarcho-syndicalist organization in exile. During his exile he worked as a cartridge carrier, stevedore and ironer. In 1957  he was sent to Spain as a delegate of the CNT, on a clandestine trip whose mission was to ascertain the state of the CNT structure there. Olegario Pachón himself verified the degree of inactivity of the anarchist organization and made it known to the CNT headquarters in exile. After Franco's death, he returned to Extremadura, where he died in 1996.

Works

References

Bibliography
 
 
 
 
 
 
 

1907 births
1996 deaths
Confederación Nacional del Trabajo members
People from the Province of Badajoz
Spanish anarchists
Exiles of the Spanish Civil War in France